Early general elections were held in Anguilla on 3 March 2000 after the government elected in 1999 collapsed after six months. The Anguilla National Alliance (ANA) emerged as the largest party, winning three of the seven seats in the House of Assembly. The ANA and the Anguilla Democratic Party had created the Anguilla United Front in January 2000, and between them the two parties held four of the seven seats, allowing them to form a government.

Results

References 

Elections in Anguilla
Anguilla
2000 in Anguilla
Anguilla
March 2000 events in North America